The 13th European Athletics Championships were held from 6 September to 12 September 1982 at the Olympic Stadium in Athens, Greece.  Contemporaneous reports on the event were given in the Glasgow Herald.

Men's results
Complete results were published.

Track
1974 | 
1978 |
1982 |
1986 |
1990 |

Field
1974 | 
1978 |
1982 |
1986 |
1990 |

 Lutz Dombrowski from East Germany jumped 8.25 m in the qualification round, which was a new championship record.

Women's results

Track
1974 | 
1978 |
1982 |
1986 |
1990 |

 Lucyna Kałek also ran 12.45 in the heats, which was a new championship record.

Field
1974 | 
1978 |
1982 |
1986 |
1990 |

Medal table

Participation
According to an unofficial count, 777 athletes from 30 countries participated in the event, 21 athletes more than the official number of 756, and one country more than the official number of 29 as published. 

 (7)
 (12)
 (34)
 (3)
 (28)
 (9)
 (65)
 (38)
 (48)
 (1)
 (29)
 (18)
 (4)
 (9)
 (55)
 (1)
 (1)
 (9)
 (18)
 (37)
 (11)
 (18)
 (92)
 (24)
 (55)
 (25)
 (2)
 (51)
 (59)
 (14)

See also
1982 in athletics (track and field)

Notes
Differences to competition format since the 1978 European Championships:
New events added: 
Women's marathon
Women's heptathlon replaces the pentathlon

References 

 EAA Official Site
 Athletix

 
European Athletics Championships
European Athletics Championships
European Athletics Championships
European Athletics Championships
Sports competitions in Athens
International athletics competitions hosted by Greece
European Athletics Championships
20th century in Athens
Athletics in Athens